Brøndbyøster station is a commuter rail railway station serving the suburb of Brøndbyøster west of Copenhagen, Denmark. It is located on the Taastrup radial of Copenhagen's S-train network.

See also
 List of railway stations in Denmark

References

S-train (Copenhagen) stations
Railway stations opened in 1953
Railway stations in Denmark opened in the 20th century